Liberty Junior High School may refer to:

 Liberty Junior High School, in the New Lenox School District 122, New Lenox, Illinois
 Liberty Junior High School, in the Richardson Independent School District, Dallas, Texas
 Liberty Junior High School, in the Bethel School District, Spanaway, Washington